Jesús Iory Aballí Martínez (born 5 April 1974) is a Cuban diver. He competed in the 2000 Summer Olympics.

References

1974 births
Living people
Divers at the 2000 Summer Olympics
Cuban male divers
Olympic divers of Cuba
Universiade bronze medalists for Cuba
Universiade medalists in diving
Medalists at the 1997 Summer Universiade
Medalists at the 1999 Summer Universiade
20th-century Cuban people